The 2018 San Jose State Spartans baseball team represented San José State University in the 2018 NCAA Division I baseball season as a member of the Mountain West Conference. The team was coached by Brad Sanfilippo and played their home games at San Jose Municipal Stadium.

Previous season

The Spartans finished 19–35–1 overall, and 10–18–1 in the conference. San José State had two Spartans drafted in the 2017 Major League Baseball draft, who were Josh Nashed for the Cleveland Indians in the 19th round and Matt Brown for the San Francisco Giants in the 27th round. This was the first Major League Baseball draft San José State experienced since the 2013 Major League Baseball draft, which took place in the 2012–13 school year.

Roster

Schedule

References

San Jose State
San Jose State Spartans baseball seasons
San Jose State